The 1974 Espirito Santo Trophy took place 22–25 October at Campo de Golf in Cajuiles, La Romana Province, Dominican Republic. It was the sixth women's golf World Amateur Team Championship for the Espirito Santo Trophy. The tournament was a 72-hole stroke play team event with 22 teams, each with up to three players. The best two scores for each round counted towards the team total.

The United States team won the Trophy, defending their title from two years ago and winning their fifth consecutive title, beating team Great Britain & Ireland  and team South Africa by 16 strokes. Great Britain & Ireland took and South Africa shared the silver medal.

The event was originally planned to be played in Malaysia but was moved because of the inability of all member countries to compete there as the Malaysian government's policy prohibited entry into Malaysia of representatives of South Africa.

Teams 
22 teams contested the event. Each team had three players, except Chile who only had two.

Results 

Sources:

Individual leaders 
There was no official recognition for the lowest individual scores.

References

External link 
World Amateur Team Championships on International Golf Federation website

Espirito Santo Trophy
Golf tournaments in the Dominican Republic
Espirito Santo Trophy
Espirito Santo Trophy
Espirito Santo Trophy